A structure fire is a fire involving the structural components of various types of residential, commercial or industrial buildings, such as barn fires. Residential buildings range from single-family detached homes and townhouses to apartments and tower blocks, or various commercial buildings ranging from offices to shopping malls. This is in contrast to "room and contents" fires, chimney fires, vehicle fires, wildfires or other outdoor fires.

Structure fires typically have a similar response from the fire department that include engines, ladder trucks, rescue squads, chief officers, and an EMS unit, each of which will have specific initial assignments. The actual response and assignments will vary between fire departments.

It is not unusual for some fire departments to have a pre-determined mobilization plan for when a fire incident is reported in certain structures in their area. This plan may include mobilizing the nearest aerial firefighting vehicle to a tower block, or a foam-carrying vehicle to structures known to contain certain hazardous chemicals.

Types (United States)

In the United States, according to NFPA, structures are divided into five construction types based on the severity of the fire hazard:

Causes of house fires

In a recent study, conducted by American Survey CO, for the period of 2005 - 2010, the causes of house fires across America were as follows:
 
 Appliances and electrical (stoves, microwaves, toasters, radiators, various heating systems, small appliances) - approximately 47%
 Gas leaks - around 5-7%
 Open flames (candles, fireplaces) - approximately 32%
 Children playing with matches - Around 10%
 Spreading of fires from house to house - approximately 3%

See Also

 Fire extinguisher
 Firefighting
 Fire prevention

External links

National Fire Protection Association (US)
NFPA Research
Haung, Kai. 2009. Population and Building Factors That Impact Residential Fire Rates in Large U.S. Cities. Applied Research Project. Texas State University. http://ecommons.txstate.edu/arp/287/

Firefighting
Types of fire